Raavanaprabhu is a 2001 Indian Malayalam-language action thriller drama film written and directed by Ranjith in his directorial debut. It is a sequel to the 1993 film Devaasuram written by Ranjith, directed by I.V. Sasi. The film stars Mohanlal in the dual role of Mangalassery Neelakandan and M. N. Karthikeyan, father and son. Napoleon reprises the role of Neelakandan's archenemy Mundackal Shekharan. It also features Vasundhara Das, Innocent, Siddique, Vijayaraghavan, and Sai Kumar. Revathi reprises the role of Bhanumathi in a cameo appearance. The plot follows M. N. Karthikeyan, Neelakandan's son and his attempts to reclaim their ancestral home Mangalassery tharavadu.

The film features original songs composed by Suresh Peters and background score by C. Rajamani. Raavanaprabhu was released on 31 August 2001 during the time of Onam in Kerala. The film performed well at the box office, becoming the highest-grossing Malayalam film of the year. It won the Kerala State Film Award for Best Film with Popular Appeal and Aesthetic Value and Best Male Playback Singer for K. J. Yesudas, and also won Filmfare Award for Best Music Director – Malayalam for Peters.

Plot

First is shown the last part of 'Devasuram' where Mangalassery Neelakandan chops off Shekharan’s right hand.

The story begins with Mangalassery Neelakandan's ('Neelan') son Karthikeyan, as he ventures out to make money which ultimately makes him a wealthy businessman and liquor baron as now Neelakandan - with the passage of time - owns liabilities and has a strained financial position. The relationship between Neelan and Karthikeyan gets fragile, as the Neelan disapproves his son's money-making methods.

Mundakkal Shekaran Nambiar - now an established industrialist and the owner of a multispeciality hospital - reminisces being imprisoned for killing one of Neelakandan's friends: Kunjananthan, decades ago on Neelakandan's and Bhanumathi's marriage day. He still carries the vengeance against Neelan for severing the former's right-hand years ago. Shekaran decides to demoralise the Mangalassery family by taking over the chairmanship of a debt-ridden Bank for confiscating the house which was kept as mortgage to the bank for the educational expenses of Suhara, daughter of one of Neelakandan's aides Hydrose.

Bhanumathi seeks treatment at Shekaran's Hospital. Even though Dr. Janaki: Shekaran's daughter, offers her the treatment she requires, Shekaran denies her treatment and asks her aides to leave the hospital, but Neelan reaches on time and strongly berates Shekaran . Neelan tries to find her treatment elsewhere, but Bhanumathi passes away in her sleep. He is shattered. Karthikeyan is not able to reach on time to set her pyre on fire - Neelan does the funeral rituals of Bhanumathi  - and he's now bent on taking revenge on Shekaran. He vandalises the hospital as his revenge.

Neelan loses his home - as Shekaran, his nephew Rajendran and the board of directors of the Bank decides to attach the Mangalassery House - and Karthikeyan ventures out in an attempt to reclaim his ancestral home – where Bhanumathi was cremated and her eternal urn stands on the Mangalassery soil. He tries to acquire the house legally from an auction with the assistance of the State Home Minister and MLA Sivadasan (Kunjananthan's son and Karthikeyan's childhood friend), but Shekaran and his cunning nephew Mundakkal Rajendran, along with Rajendran's evil accomplice Maniyampra Purushothaman acquire it back using a faux concealed tender. As a last resort, Karthikeyan seizes Purushothaman's Mercedes Benz car and also abducts Janaki in an attempt to blackmail Shekaran, and harbours her in his friend – Sakhtivel Gounder's house in Pollachi, where the Gounder family takes great care of her as their own daughter. It is during this period, Karthikeyan and Janaki fall in love with each other.

Karthikeyan gets the Mangalassery House (Tharavadu) back when Shekaran strikes a compromise without the knowledge of Rajendran and Janaki's fiancé, Sreenivasan Nambiar IPS. Janaki is subsequently released. As a result of arguments between Janaki and Sreenivasan about her chastity while being in the custody of Karthikeyan, and she not giving a written statement to the police against him because of her liking towards Karthikeyan, the fixed marriage is called off by Janaki.

Rajendran makes a last attempt to kill Karthikeyan, but instead kills Neelakandan by lighting him on fire. Rajendran in turn gets killed by Neelan after a perfect knife throw, which decapitates the former. Karthikeyan, now infuriated on his father's murder, goes to kill Shekaran by burning him. But an elderly Warrier stops him and brings him back. Shekaran realizes his mistakes, as well as the influence of the kind Warrier on both Neelan and Karthikeyan (Warrier's intervention prevented Neelakandan from killing Shekaran decades ago: in Devasuram).

In the end, the eternal urns of Bhanumathi and Neelakandan are shown; Karthikeyan becomes the head of the Mangalassery house, and the Sreenivasan IPS gives Janaki back to him, thus parting ways with the would-be couple on a happy note. Karthikeyan and Janaki are happily married with everyone's blessings.

Cast

Production
Raavanaprabhu marks the directorial debut of Ranjith and acts as a sequel to the 1993 film Devaasuram written by Ranjith. The plot follows M. N. Karthikeyan, a new character, the son of Mangalasserry Neelakandan. Vasundhara Das played the female lead role, who debuted in Malayalam with the film. She started by filming the song "Pottukuthedi" which was shot in five days. Kanal Kannan was the action choreographer of the film. The Karthikeyan vs. SP Sreenivasan fight scene featuring Mohanlal and Siddique was choreographed by Kanal Kannan, who then worked in the film. Raavanaprabhu marks the debut work of Hein in Malayalam cinema.

Soundtrack
The film's soundtrack includes five songs composed by Suresh Peters and written by Gireesh Puthenchery. "Vandemukunda Hare" was taken from the prequel Devaasuram originally sung and composed by M. G. Radhakrishnan. The soundtrack album was released on 31 December 2000 by the label East Coast Audio Entertainments. The film's background score was composed by C. Rajamani.

Reception
Raavanaprabhu was released as an Onam festival release on 31 August 2001. The film was a commercial success at the box office and went on to become the highest-grossing Malayalam film of the year 2001. Mohanlal's frequently used punchline Savari Giri Giri became a popular catchphrase.

Awards
Kerala State Film Awards
 Best Film with Popular Appeal and Aesthetic Value
 Best Male Playback Singer – K. J. Yesudas

Filmfare Awards South
 Best Music Director (Malayalam) – Suresh Peters

Asianet Film Awards
 Best Male Playback Singer- P. Jayachandran
 Best Supporting Actor- Innocent
 Best Makeup Artist – P. V. Shankar, Salim

References

External links
 
 "Know Ravanaprabhu courier service? Dubai-based Malayali outwits online fraudster". The News Minute article

2000s Malayalam-language films
Films scored by Suresh Peters
2001 action drama films
2001 films
Indian action drama films
Indian sequel films
!Mangalassery2
Films directed by Ranjith
Films about father–son relationships
Fictional rivalries
Films about feuds
Films shot at Varikkasseri Mana
Films shot in Pollachi
Aashirvad Cinemas films